Typhlodaphne payeni is a species of sea snail, a marine gastropod mollusk in the family Borsoniidae.

Description
The shell grows to a length of 10 mm.

Distribution
This marine species occurs off Tierra del Fuego.

References

External links
 Rochebrune A.T. de & Mabille J. (1885). Diagnoses de mollusques nouveaux, recueillis par les membres de la mission du Cap Horn et M. Lebrun, Préparateur au Muséum, chargé d'une mission à Santa-Cruz de Patagonie. Bulletin de la Société Philomathique de Paris. (7) 9(3): 100-111
   Bouchet P., Kantor Yu.I., Sysoev A. & Puillandre N. (2011) A new operational classification of the Conoidea. Journal of Molluscan Studies 77: 273–308 
 
 MNHN, Paris: syntype

payeni
Gastropods described in 1885